The 1954 Maine gubernatorial election took place on September 13, 1954. Incumbent Republican Governor Burton M. Cross was seeking a second term which would have made him the fifth consecutive Governor (all Republicans) to be elected twice.  Democratic state representative Edmund Muskie, widely viewed as the underdog due to Maine's solidly Republican history, was able to pull an upset victory and become the first Democrat to be elected to the Blaine House since Louis J. Brann in 1934, and only the fourth Democrat in the 20th century.

Results

Notes

1954
Maine
Gubernatorial
September 1954 events in the United States